Pune Race Course is a racecourse located in Pune Cantonment, western India. It is located 5–6 km from downtown Pune and 12–13 km from Pune airport. The land is controlled by the Indian Army.

Additional stabling for the horses is near Empress Garden,  from the course. The racing season runs from July to October and includes the Pune Derby, the RWITC Invitational, the Independence Cup and the Southern Command Cup. It is managed by Royal Western India Turf Club.

Recent derby winners include 2015 Bullrun ridden by P Kamlesh, 2016 Accolade ridden by P Trevor, and the 2017 Lady in Lace ridden by Suraj Narredu.

References

External links
 Royal Western India Turf Club: Pune Race Course

Horse racing venues in India
Sport in Pune
1830 establishments in India
Sports venues completed in 1830